Bruce Arnold Young (born April 22, 1956) is an American television, film, and stage actor, television writer and screenwriter.

Career
Young is best known for his role as Captain Simon Banks in the UPN science fiction police drama The Sentinel. Young also had roles in the films Risky Business, Jurassic Park III, The Color of Money, Basic Instinct, Into Temptation, Undisputed, and Enough. His other television roles include parts in 21 Jump Street, E/R, Highlander: The Series, Quantum Leap, NYPD Blue, The X-Files, Cold Case, Lady Blue, Ghost Whisperer, Grey's Anatomy and Prison Break.

As television writer and screenwriter, Young has written for such television series and films as E/R and The Lord Protector: The Riddle of the Chosen.

From 1983 to 1987, while with the Organic Theater Company in Chicago, Young created, produced and was a cast member in "Dungeon Master", a fusion of improvisational theatre and live action role-playing; each show was a fantasy adventure scenario with theater cast members playing the monsters and non-player characters and volunteer audience members serving as the player characters. Young restarted Dungeon Master in Los Angeles in 2001, where it is still active, although Young stopped active participation in 2006.

Filmography

 Thief (1981) as Mechanic #2
 Risky Business (1983) as Jackie
 Nothing in Common (1986) as Gene
 The Color of Money (1986) as Moselle
 21 Jump Street (1987, TV Series) as Sgt. James Adabo
 227...Far From The Tree (1987, TV Series) as Mop
 An Innocent Man (1989) as Jingles
 Hot Shots! (1991) as "Red" Herring
 Basic Instinct (1992) as Andrews
 Trespass (1992) as Raymond
 Blink (1994) as Lt. Mitchell
 Naked Gun : The Final Insult (1994) as Tyrone (uncredited)
 The War (1994) as Moe Henry
 The Tie That Binds (1995) as Gil Chandler
 Normal Life (1996) as Agent Parker 
 Phenomenon (1996) as FBI Agent Jack Hatch 
 Angel on Abbey Street (1999) as Muskat
 Jurassic Park III (2001) as M. B. Nash
 Enough (2002) as Self-Defense Trainer
 Undisputed (2002) as Charles Soward
 Ticker (2002, Short) as Bodyguard
 Home on the Range (2004) additional voices
 Edmond (2005) as Police Officer
 Love Is the Drug (2006) as Phill Hackwith
 Into Temptation (2009) as Lloyd Montag
 The Next Three Days (2010) as Craftsman in Elevator (uncredited)
 Star Trek: Renegades (2015, TV Series) as Borrada

References

External links
 

1956 births
Living people
African-American male actors
American male film actors
American male television actors
American television writers
American male screenwriters
American male television writers
21st-century African-American people
20th-century African-American people